This article serves as an index - as complete as possible - of all the honorific orders or similar decorations received by the Johor Royal Family, classified by continent, awarding country and recipient.

This is a list of honours and titles received by the royal family of Johor, one of the thirteen states of Malaysia.

Sultanate of Johor 
Awards received include:

 Sultan Ibrahim Ismail of Johor :
  Grand Master and First Class (DK I) of the Royal Family Order of Johor 
  Grand Master and First Class (SPMJ) of the Order of the Crown of Johor with title Dato  Grand Master and Knight Grand Commander of the Order of the Loyalty of Sultan Ismail (1960, SSIJ) with title Dato 
  Sultan Ismail Coronation Medal (PSI, 1st class) 
  Sultan Mahmud Iskandar Coronation Medal 
 Permaisuri Raja Zarith Sofiah :
  First Class (DK I) of the Royal Family Order of Johor 
  Second Class (DK II) of the Royal Family Order of Johor 
  First Class of the Order of the Crown of Johor (SPMJ) with title Dato  
  Sultan Ibrahim Coronation Medal (PSI, 1st class) 
 Tunku Ismail Idris, Crown Prince of Johor : 
  Second Class (DK II, 8 April 2006), now First Class (DK I, 11 April 2009) of the Royal Family Order of Johor
  Companion (SMJ, 8 April 2004), now Knight Grand Commander (SPMJ, 8 April 2005) of the Order of the Crown of Johor with title Dato'''  
  Sultan Ibrahim Coronation Medal (PSI, 1st class) 
 Tunku Aminah, only daughter of Ibrahim Ismail of Johor :
  First Class of the Royal Family Order of Johor (DK I, 22 November 2012) 
  Grand Commander of the Order of the Crown of Johor (DPMJ, 11 April 2009) with title Dato
  Sultan Ibrahim Coronation Medal (PSI, 1st class) 
 Tunku Idris, second son of Ibrahim Ismail of Johor
  First Class of the Royal Family Order of Johor (DK I, 22 November 2012) 
  Knight Grand Commander of the Order of the Crown of Johor (SPMJ) with title Dato
  Sultan Ibrahim Coronation Medal (PSI, 1st class) 
 Tunku ‘Abdu’l Rahman, fourth son of Ibrahim Ismail of Johor :
  First Class of the Royal Family Order of Johor (DK I, 22 November 2012) 
  Grand Commander of the Order of the Crown of Johor (DPMJ, 11 April 2009) with title Dato
  Sultan Ibrahim Coronation Medal (PSI, 1st class) 
 Tunku ‘Abu Bakar, fifth son of Ibrahim Ismail of Johor :
  First Class of the Royal Family Order of Johor (DK I, 22 November 2012) 
  Sultan Ibrahim Coronation Medal (PSI, 1st class) 

 Malaysia, sultanates and states 
They have been awarded :

 Malaysia 
 Sultan Ibrahim Ismail of Johor:
  Recipient of the Order of the Crown of the Realm (DMN, 2 March 2015) 
  Knight Grand Commander of the Order of the Defender of the Realm (SMN, 3 June 1987) with title Tun Sultanate of Kedah To be completed if any ... Sultanate of Kelantan 
 Sultan Ibrahim Ismail of Johor:
  Recipient of the Royal Family Order or Star of Yunus (DK)

 Yamtuan Besar of Negeri Sembilan 
 Sultan Ibrahim Ismail of Johor:
  Member of the Royal Family Order of Negeri Sembilan (DKNS, 14.02.2011) 

 Sultanate of Pahang 
 Sultan Ibrahim Ismail of Johor:
  Member 1st class of the Family Order of the Crown of Indra of Pahang (DK I, 24 October 2011)

 Sultanate of Perak 
 Sultan Ibrahim Ismail of Johor:
  Recipient of the Royal Family Order of Perak (DK)  
 Permaisuri Raja Zarith Sofiah :
  Recipient of the Royal Family Order of Perak (DK, 21.05.2012)   
  Grand Knight of the Order of Cura Si Manja Kini (the Perak Sword of State, SPCM) with title Dato' Sri Sultanate of Perlis 
 Sultan Ibrahim Ismail of Johor:
  Recipient of the Perlis Family Order of the Gallant Prince Syed Putra Jamalullail (DK, 16.05.2010) 

 Sultanate of Selangor 
 Sultan Ibrahim Ismail of Johor:
  First Class of the Royal Family Order of Selangor (DK I, 13.01.2011)

 Sultanate of Terengganu 
 Sultan Ibrahim Ismail of Johor:
  Member first class of the Family Order of Terengganu (DK I, 27.04.2013)

 State of Malacca To be completed if any ... State of Penang To be completed if any ... State of Sabah 
 Sultan Ibrahim Ismail of Johor:
  Grand Commander of the Order of Kinabalu (SPDK) 

 State of Sarawak To be completed if any ... Asian honours 

 Sultanate of Brunei Darussalam 
 Sultan Ibrahim Ismail of Johor:
  Recipient of the Royal Family Order of the Crown of Brunei (DKMB)To be completed if any ... Far East  To be completed if any ... Middle East   
 Sultan Ibrahim Ismail of Johor:
  Knight Grand Cordon of the Order of Isa bin Salman Al KhalifaTo be completed if any ... American  honours To be completed if any ... European honours To be completed if any ... African honours To be completed if any ...''

References

Notes 

 
Johor